John Fallon (born 16 August 1940) is a Scottish former professional footballer and member of the Celtic squad that won the European Cup in 1967, which came to be known as the Lisbon Lions.

Career
Fallon signed for Celtic, the team he supported in childhood, from junior team Fauldhouse United in December 1958 to understudy for Frank Haffey and made his debut in September 1959 against Clyde. He replaced Haffey as first choice goalkeeper in 1963 and played his part in the Cup Winners' Cup run of 1964, where they lost out to the Hungarian team MTK Budapest 4–3 in the semi-finals, after holding a 3–0 lead from the first leg at Celtic Park. He remained first choice goalkeeper until the signing of veteran Ronnie Simpson from Hibernian in 1965.

Fallon became the only Lisbon Lion not to play in Celtic's win in the 1967 European Cup Final against Inter Milan, as he was the (unused) substitute goalkeeper. At that time the only substitute permitted was for the goalkeeping position.

He was presented with a winner's medal by captain Billy McNeill at a post-match dinner, but then had it taken from him in suspicious circumstances. According to his autobiography, Keeping in Paradise (2015), manager Jock Stein, asked Fallon for his medal back. Fallon was then presented with a replica, while the real medal ended up with Celtic's chairman, Sir Robert Kelly.

As a result of winning the European Cup, Celtic entered the Intercontinental Cup later that year, a two-leg match against Racing Club of Argentina. While warming up for the second leg, a brick (Robert Kelly said in his book, Celtic that it was a "flat iron bar") thrown or catapulted by a member of the crowd, struck Ronnie Simpson on the head. With Simpson unable to play, Fallon was called on to keep goal in a bad-tempered second leg, and an even more bad-tempered play-off. Although Celtic lost the return leg, and the subsequent play-off in Montevideo, amid accusations of extreme foul play from the Racing players, Fallon distinguished himself with a string of saves which caused one commentator to remark: "If that's the reserve keeper, what must the other guy be like?"

According to Kelly, when Celtic tried to get the second leg declared void because of the Simpson incident, Racing Club used Fallon's heroic performance as their counter argument, and the result stood. Fallon also played in the team that won the Alfredo di Stefano Trophy, a testimonial for the Real Madrid player.

After Simpson's retirement, Fallon took over as first choice at Celtic. He lost his place to Evan Williams due to a long illness, sitting out the 1970 European Cup Final. He left the club in 1971 and subsequently played for Motherwell and Morton before retiring from senior football. He later owned a pub in Blantyre, where he had lived for many years.

In May 2019, Fallon was reunited with his European Cup winner's medal after an "eagle-eyed good samaritan" spotted it and returned the medal to Celtic. "It feels great to be reunited with my medal, and I've got to thank [Celtic chairman] Peter Lawwell and everyone at Celtic for going to all this effort and finding the medal that was lost," Fallon told Celtic TV. "I did get a replica one at one point, but it didn't seem the same."

References

External links 

1940 births
Living people
Sportspeople from Cambuslang
Scottish footballers
Association football goalkeepers
Celtic F.C. players
Motherwell F.C. players
Greenock Morton F.C. players
Scottish Football League players
Fauldhouse United F.C. players
Scottish Junior Football Association players
UEFA Champions League winning players
Footballers from South Lanarkshire